U.S. Route 40 (US 40) runs east–west across south central Illinois for . US 40 enters the state from Missouri across the Poplar Street Bridge over the Mississippi River at East St. Louis concurrent with Interstate 55 (I-55) and I-64 and exits just south of State Line, Indiana, running concurrently with I-70. For the majority of its route through Illinois, US 40 follows the National Road, including the route's initial western terminus at Vandalia.

For nearly its entire route, US 40 is two-lane and rural, with the exception of portions in and around major towns and cities. For its entire length, US 40 closely aligns with I-70. Not only does the route intersect with the Interstate six times, but also has three concurrencies with the highway; both highways exit into Indiana on the same road.

Route description

East St. Louis to Highland
Starting from the Poplar Street Bridge, US 40, as well as I-55 and I-64, enters East St. Louis. Just east of the bridge, the three routes run concurrently with IL 3 as well as the Great River Road. After a series of interchanges, both I-64 and IL 3 branches off while I-70 joins the I-55/US 40 concurrencies. From then on, they meet IL 203 at a combination interchange, IL 111 at a diamond interchange, Black Lane at an incomplete interchange, I-255 at another combination interchange, IL 157 at a parclo interchange, and IL 159 at a cloverleaf interchange. At a trumpet interchange  from the Missouri state line, US 40 branches off from I-55 and I-70. From then on, it meets IL 162 and then IL 4 at a one-quadrant interchange.

Highland to Vandalia
Starting at Highland, US 40 runs concurrently with IL 143. Then, at the roundabout, IL 160 joins the concurrency. IL 160 soon leaves the concurrency around a mile east of the roundabout. IL 143 then also leaves US 40. US 40 then joins I-70 again from exit 30 to the next exit, exit 36. After US 40 leaves I-70, it parallels I-70 for most of the length through Illinois. At a parclo interchange on exit 41 for I-70, US 40 turns south and then east from the northern part of the interchange. It then meets IL 127 at Greenville, IL 140 east of Mulberry Grove, and I-70 at another diamond interchange (exit 61).

Vandalia to Indiana state line
In Vandalia, IL 185 joins US 40 eastward. Then, the two routes run concurrently with US 51 all the way to downtown. US 51 then leaves the concurrency of two routes. Then, IL 185 also leaves from US 40 just west of another diamond interchange of I-70 (exit 68). IL 128 joins US 40 up to Altamont where IL 128 branches south to I-70. As US 40 reaches Effingham, it briefly bends north until it reaches the intersection of US 40/IL 32/IL 33. At that point, only IL 33 carries on eastward with US 40. At downtown Effingham, US 45 briefly joins from the south and then leaves northward. Soon, IL 33 branches off eastward. From then on, US 40 intersects IL 130, IL 49, and IL 1. US 40 then joins I-70 at another diamond interchange for the third time as the two are about to enter Indiana.

History
Up until 1935, Illinois Route 11 (IL 11) roughly followed the old alignment of US 40 from St. Louis to near Terre Haute, Indiana. After 1935, IL 11 was decommissioned. But in the mid-1940s, IL 11 was reused after US 40 was realigned south of downtown Greenville and Mulberry Grove, Illinois. In 1947, IL 11 was extended to Vandalia via US 40's old alignment after US 40 bypassed Hagarstown. It followed a part of the original alignment of US 40 between IL 127 in Greenville and US 51 in Vandalia. By 1948, IL 11 was partially replaced by US 40 Alternate; later acquired by IL 140 in 1967.

Major intersections

See also

References

External links

 Illinois
Transportation in St. Clair County, Illinois
Transportation in Madison County, Illinois
Transportation in Bond County, Illinois
Transportation in Fayette County, Illinois
Transportation in Effingham County, Illinois
Transportation in Cumberland County, Illinois
Transportation in Clark County, Illinois
40